Douglas High School is a public high school located in Douglas, Alabama.

Currently, the school educates about 600 students in grades 9 to 12 in the Marshall County School System.

References

Educational institutions in the United States with year of establishment missing
Public high schools in Alabama
Schools in Marshall County, Alabama